Jevaughn Minzie (born 20 July 1995) is a Jamaican sprinter. He is one of only fourteen youth sprinters to run 100 metres in less than 10.3 seconds.

In the 200 metres final of the 2011 CARIFTA Games, Minzie mimicked Usain Bolt's 2008 Beijing pre-finish celebration, but was subsequently caught by Machel Cedenio. He was a part of the Jamaican relay team which won the gold medal at the 2016 Summer Olympics, running only in the heats.

References

External links

1995 births
Living people
Jamaican male sprinters
Athletes (track and field) at the 2016 Summer Olympics
Olympic athletes of Jamaica
Olympic gold medalists for Jamaica
Olympic gold medalists in athletics (track and field)
Medalists at the 2016 Summer Olympics
Athletes (track and field) at the 2020 Summer Olympics